Wiebe E. Bijker (born 19 March 1951, Delft) is a Dutch professor Emeritus, former chair of the Department of Social Science and Technology at Maastricht University in the Netherlands.

Early life 
Bijker's father was an engineer involved in implementing the Delta Plan after a disastrous dike breach in the Netherlands in 1953 when young Bijker was two years old and later became deputy director of the Delft Hydraulics Laboratory. Presumably, the unique fact of parts of the Netherlands being below sea level, the well-known concerns in innovation surrounding this condition for centuries, and his father's involvement all contributed to the younger Bijker's interest in technology studies.

Education 
After finishing Gymnasium in Emmeloord (1969), the younger Bijker received his BSc degree in philosophy from the University of Amsterdam (1974), his engineer's degree in physical engineering from the Delft University of Technology (1976), and his PhD degree from the University of Twente in 1990.

Career 
Bijker was an assistant and associate professor of philosophy from 1987 at the Maastricht University before becoming full professor of technology and society in 1994. Bijker's fields of research include social and historical studies of science, technology and society; theories of technology development; methodology of science, technology and society studies; democratisation of technological culture; science and technology policies; ICT, multimedia and the social-cultural dimensions of the information society; gender and technology; and meta studies of architecture, planning, and civil engineering. With Trevor Pinch he is considered as one of the main adherents of the Social Construction of Technology-approach, (SCOT) their 1984 article "The Social Construction of Facts and Artefacts: or How the Sociology of Science and the Sociology of Technology might Benefit Each Other" is cited as the first substantive work to elaborate on the SCOT perspective. Central to the SCOT theoretical framework is the idea of 'interpretive flexibility', that is that the products of scientific and technological endeavours are not fixed on a given trajectory determined by a physical nature, but rather interact with the social environments in which they are produced. To illustrate their theorectical argument Pinch and Bijker, in their 1984 article, use the development of the bicycle and the substantive shaping of this through the influences of various user groups, manufacturers and interested others.

On 12 May 2017 Wiebe Bijker became emeritus professor.

Selected publications

Books

Journal articles

See also 
 Science and technology studies
 Sociology of scientific knowledge
 Sociotechnology

References

External links 
 Personal website at University of Maastricht

1951 births
Delft University of Technology alumni
Dutch engineers
20th-century Dutch historians
Dutch sociologists
Historians of technology
Living people
Academic staff of Maastricht University
People from Delft
Philosophers of technology
Sociologists of science
Leonardo da Vinci Medal recipients